The Tulsa–Wichita State men's basketball rivalry is an American college basketball rivalry between the Tulsa Golden Hurricane men's basketball team of the  University of Tulsa and the Wichita State Shockers men's basketball team of Wichita State University. Wichita State leads the all-time series 76–63.

History
The first game played between the two schools took place on January 6, 1931, in Wichita, Kansas. Tulsa won 32–30. The teams would play each other annually as members of the Missouri Valley Conference from 1934 to 1996 and 2000–2005. The rivalry maintained a certain balance between the two schools until a run of Tulsa dominance in the rivalry culminating with 13 straight wins over Wichita State from 1993 to 2002. Since 2003, Wichita State has won 10 of their past 11 matchups with Tulsa. Losing only in 2015 as the No. 9 ranked team in the country.

The rivalry was fully renewed when Wichita State joined The American for all sports except football. In their first game since 1995 as conference-mates, the Golden Hurricane played the No. 5 ranked Shockers close, losing only by 3.

Game results

References 

College basketball rivalries in the United States
Tulsa Golden Hurricane men's basketball
Wichita State Shockers men's basketball